Mary Louise Stepan (February 2, 1935 – December 15, 2021) was an American competition swimmer and Olympic medalist. As a 17-year-old, Stepan represented the United States at the 1952 Summer Olympics in Helsinki.  She received a bronze medal as a member of the third-place U.S. team in the 4×100-meter freestyle relay, together with teammates Jackie LaVine, Jody Alderson and Evelyn Kawamoto.  Individually, Stepan also competed in the women's 100-meter freestyle, advanced to the event final, and finished seventh overall with a time of 1:08.0.

Stepan later married Richard Wehman and had four children. She was also a member of the United States Olympic Committee. Stepan died in Winnetka, Illinois, on December 15, 2021, at the age of 86.

See also
 List of Olympic medalists in swimming (women)

References

1935 births
2021 deaths
21st-century American women
American female freestyle swimmers
Olympic bronze medalists for the United States in swimming
Swimmers from Chicago
Swimmers at the 1952 Summer Olympics
Medalists at the 1952 Summer Olympics